Gaogouli County (高句驪縣; Goguryeo County or Koguryo County in Korean) was a county under the administration of Xuantu Commandery located in southern Manchuria and the northern Korean peninsula. It was established by the Han dynasty after its conquest of Gojoseon to keep the tribes of Goguryeo in check. In 75 BC, Xuantu Commandery was forced to move its seat of power from Fort Okjeo to Gaogouli County due to Yemaek raids. From 75 BC to 12 AD, Goguryeo tribes were under administration of Gaogouli County and engaged in tributary relationship with the Han dynasty. In 12 AD, Goguryeo rebelled against the Han dynasty and established its own kingdom, and in 105 AD, began attacking the Chinese commanderies of Xuantu and Liaodong. Later, in the 4th century, the State of Goguryeo conquered Xuantu Commandery, along with the Liaodong and Lelang commanderies, ending Chinese rule over the Liaodong Peninsula and the Korean Peninsula.

Notes

Former commanderies of China in Korea